Eusébio (1942–2014) scored 41 goals in 64 matches for the Portugal national football team between 1961 and 1973.	

He remained the national team's top scorer of all time until his record was broken by Pauleta in 2005; he is now third with the record being held by Cristiano Ronaldo.

Eusébio was the top scorer at the 1966 FIFA World Cup with nine goals, including four in the quarter-final against North Korea. He scored two international hat-tricks: his haul against North Korea, and three goals in a victory over Turkey in qualification for the tournament.

Goals

Hat-tricks

See also
List of FIFA World Cup hat-tricks

References

Eusebio
List
Goal